Changzhi East railway station is a railway station in Luzhou District, Changzhi, Shanxi, China.

Construction of the station began in June 2016. It opened with the Taiyuan–Jiaozuo high-speed railway on 12 December 2020. The station will be the western terminus of the planned Liaocheng–Handan–Changzhi high-speed railway.

References 

Railway stations in Shanxi
Railway stations in China opened in 2020